P.K. Mohammed or Chekannur Maulavi
(born in 1936) was an Indian secular Islamicist from  Chekannur, Malappuram district of Kerala, India. He is the founder of the Quran Sunnath. He disappeared on 29 July 1993. His death is uncertain.

Career
Maulavi founded  Quran Sunnath Society which is known for Jamitha Teacher, the first Indian woman imam.

Disappearance and investigation 
The CBI took over the case in 1996, and in 2000 arrested two members of the ultra orthodox Muslim sect under suspicion of murder.

The case was hampered by the disappearance of a number of witnesses, whose property was seized when they fled abroad rather than appear to testify in 2008.

Mohammed’s wife filed a petition seeking to arraign A.P. Aboobacker Musaliyar as a murder suspect through her lawyer, Advocate S.K. Premraj which was allowed.
The court found that Mohammed’s body was disposed of in some mysterious manner so as never to be recovered, which was dismissed by High Court later

A Decision Bench of the Kerala High Court acquitted the first accused. With this, all accused in the case have been let off, with the sole exception of V.V. Hamsa, who was sentenced to two terms of life imprisonment in 2010. Even Mohammed’s death could not be proved.

In popular culture
His disappearance is the subject of a 2009 documentary, Ore Oru Chekannur.

See also
List of people who disappeared
List of unsolved murders

References

External links
 www.moulavichekanoor.com
 Khur'aan Sunnath Society

1936 births
1990s missing person cases
1993 deaths
Hate crimes in India
Indian Quranist Muslims
Malayali people
Male murder victims
Missing person cases in India
Murder convictions without a body
People declared dead in absentia
People from Malappuram
Unsolved murders in India